Irene Steyn (born 6 July 1977) is a Namibian professional racing cyclist. In 2013, she won both the Namibian National Road Race Championships, and the Namibian National Time Trial Championships.

Major results

2013
 National Road Championships
1st  Road race
1st  Time trial
2014
 National Road Championships
1st  Time trial
3rd Road race
2015
 2nd  Team time trial, African Road Championships
 National Road Championships
3rd Road race
3rd Time trial
 4th 947 Cycle Challenge
2017
 National Road Championships
2nd Time trial
3rd Road race
2018
 1st  Time trial, National Road Championships
2019
 National Road Championships
3rd Road race
3rd Time trial
2020
 2nd Road race, National Road Championships

References

External links
 
 

1977 births
Living people
Namibian female cyclists
Place of birth missing (living people)
20th-century Namibian women
21st-century Namibian women